Cabin Still Bourbon is a Bourbon whiskey distilled in Louisville, Kentucky and bottled in Bardstown, Kentucky by the Heaven Hill company. 
It is sold in glass in 16 oz pint bottles, glass 750 ml bottles, glass 1-liter bottles, and plastic 1.75 liter bottles.

External links
Heaven Hill Official site
The Whisky Portal

Bourbon whiskey
Bardstown, Kentucky
Economy of Louisville, Kentucky
Alcoholic drink brands
American brands